Amanda Jeannette Bridel (born March 26, 1994), known as AJ Bridel, is a Canadian actress and singer. She first rose to prominence as a finalist on  Over the Rainbow, where she finished in third-place. Since then, Bridel starred as Lauren in the Canadian premiere of  Kinky Boots at the Royal Alexandra Theatre and has appeared in several regional productions across Ontario. In 2022, Bridel started voicing the main character Pipp Petals in the My Little Pony series.

Early life and education
Bridel was born in Calgary, but raised in Kitchener, Ontario. Bridel was first drawn to musical theatre after listening to the music for Les Misérables from a CD owned by her parents. As a teenager, Bridel was a member of the Kitchener Waterloo Musical Productions, a non-profit community theatre organization. She performed in the organization's productions of Fiddler on the Roof,  Annie,  Footloose, and  13.

Bridel attended Eastwood Collegiate Institute, in Kitchener. An  honours student in high school, Bridel enrolled in the musical theatre program at Sheridan College but withdrew to appear on Over the Rainbow. Bridel has since completed courses through  Queen's University.

Career
In 2011, at the age of 18, Bridel was cast in her first professional production as Mary in The Little Years, a play by John Mighton. The play was performed at the Stratford Festival between July 13 and September 24, 2011.

In 2012, Bridel auditioned for  Over the Rainbow, a Canadian reality competition based on the 2010 BBC series of the same name. The winner of the series would star in the role of Dorothy in a new production of  Andrew Lloyd Webber's new stage musical of  The Wizard of Oz at the Ed Mirvish Theatre. Following a boot camp held by Lloyd Webber, Bridel was chosen as one of the ten contestants. During the competition, Lloyd Webber commented that "there are probably several roles that I would cast her in right away." On November 4, 2012, Bridel was eliminated in third place.

Bridel was cast as Dorothy Gale in a production of The Wizard of Oz that was produced by Drayton Entertainment in March 2015.

In 2015, Bridel was cast as Lauren in the Canadian production of Kinky Boots, which played at the Royal Alexandra Theatre between June 2015 and May 2016. Bridel appeared on Canada AM, where she performed The History of Wrong Guys, a song her character performs in the show. For her performance as Lauren, Bridel received a nomination for Outstanding Female Performance in a Musical at the 2016 Dora Awards. She also was nominated for and won a 2016 Toronto Theatre Critics Award for Best Supporting Actress in a Musical.

Between 2016 and 2020, Bridel appeared in four Ross Petty Christmas pantomimes. In 2016, Bridel appeared in her first Ross Petty pantomime, where she starred as Sleeping Beauty in Sleeping Beauty. She also appeared in the 2017 production as Jane in A Christmas Carol, which was also filmed and aired on  Family Channel and  CBC across Canada. Bridel then starred as Maid Marion in the 2019 Ross Petty production of Lil' Red Robin Hood. In 2020, she appeared in There’s No Place Like Home For The Holidays, which was performed as an online revue due to the COVID-19 pandemic.	

In 2017, Bridel was named the new Anne in the  Charlottetown Festival's production of Anne of Green Gables: The Musical, the longest running annual musical theatre production. Bridel reprised her role of Anne in the 2018 production.

In April 2022, Bridel began starring in the main voice role of Pipp Petals in My Little Pony, replacing Sofia Carson. She currently voices the character in the made-for-YouTube 2D animated series My Little Pony: Tell Your Tale and in the Netflix animated series My Little Pony: Make Your Mark. Bridel also reprised her voice role in the 2022 Netflix animated specials, My Little Pony: Make Your Mark and My Little Pony: Winter Wishday. She also lent her voice to the video game My Little Pony: A Maretime Bay Adventure.

Personal life

In 2018 Bridel was nearly involved in the 2018 Toronto van attack, having been about 5 minutes away when it occurred.

In 2021 Bridel married Adam Craig.

Theatre credits

Filmography

Television

Film

Audiobooks

Video games

Awards and nominations

References

External links
 

1994 births
Living people
Canadian musical theatre actresses
Actresses from Calgary
Musicians from Calgary
Actresses from Kitchener, Ontario
Musicians from Kitchener, Ontario
Participants in Canadian reality television series
21st-century Canadian actresses
Date of birth missing (living people)
21st-century Canadian women singers